Clarke County Courthouse may refer to:

 Clarke County Courthouse (Alabama), part of the Grove Hill Courthouse Square Historic District, Grove Hill, Alabama
Clarke County Courthouse (Georgia), Athens, Georgia
 Clarke County Courthouse (Iowa), Osceola, Iowa
 Old Clarke County Courthouse (Virginia), Berryville, Virginia

See also 
 Clark County Courthouse (disambiguation)